Kamptonema chlorinum is a species of cyanobacteria belonging to the family Microcoleaceae.

Synonym:
 Oscillatoria chlorina Kützing ex Gomont (= basionym)

References

Oscillatoriales